Bodoland University (BU), established in 2009, is a public state collegiate  university located in Kokrajhar, Assam, India. It is the first university in the Bodoland Territorial Region (BTR) along with the Lower Assam region (except the capital Guwahati).

The university offers undergraduate programs in various disciplines such as B.A., B.Sc., B.Com, B.Tech, BBA, BCA, and B.Ed. It also offers postgraduate programs such as M.A., M.Sc., M.Com, M.Tech, MBA, MCA, and M.Ed. The university also offers Ph.D. programs in various disciplines.

History
Bodoland University was established by the Bodoland University Act, 2009 by upgrading the Kokrajhar campus of Gauhati University into a state university.

Colleges
Its jurisdiction extends over 5 districts - Baksa, Chirang, Kokrajhar, Tamulpur, and Udalguri .

Departments

  Assamese
  Bamboo Technology
 Biotechnology
  Bodo
 Business Administration
 Chemistry
 Commerce
 Computer Science &  Technology
 Economics
 Education 
  English
 Geography
 History
 Mathematical Sciences
 Physics
 Political Science
 Zoology

Facilities 
 Health Care
 Central Library 
 Computer Center 
 Hostel for Boys & Girls 
 University Bus Service 
 University Canteen

References

External links 
 Official Website
 Student Admission Portal

 
Universities in Assam
Education in Kokrajhar district
2009 establishments in Assam
Educational institutions established in 2009
State universities in India